The Museum of Local History is located at 6866 Caroline St, Milton, Florida, and is operated by the Santa Rosa Historical Society.  The museum exhibits depict the history of industry and fashion in Santa Rosa County.
 It is part of the Milton Historic District, which is listed on the National Register of Historic Places. Unfortunately the museum is rarely open as the Historical Society primarily uses the attached theatre for private weddings.

Footnotes

External links

Websites
 Museum of Local History

Museums in Santa Rosa County, Florida
Historical society museums in Florida
Museums established in 1988
1988 establishments in Florida